Christian Biegai (born 14 December 1974) is a film composer, sound designer and saxophonist. He studied music at the Berlin University of the Arts, the Royal College of Music in London and at Rutgers University in New Jersey, United States.

He has written film scores for feature films, documentaries, TV drama and animated films. Whistle (2002), directed by Duncan Jones, was shown at festivals around the world, including several broadcasts on Film Four.  In 2004, he refined his audio-post production skills under the leadership of  Frank Verderosa at Planet V, New York City. Working with digital artist and multimedia producer Helena Bulaja resulted in composing and recording the score for the fairytale Regoch (2006), which can be heard on the release of "Croatian Tales of Long Ago, Part Two" and collaborating in Helena Bulaja's latest project about Nikola Tesla, which features Laurie Anderson and Terry Gilliam amongst other artists. Christian composed the score for director Marc Meyer's film Sunday, in August, which was broadcast on France 3, and won the Minister of Art Promotion Prize at the Film Festival in Dresden in 2005. The same year he teamed up with New York-based director Matthew Timms, sound designing and scoring the film How I know you (2005). Working at Park Road Post as an editor in 2006, Christian contributed also a string quartet piece for Academy Award nominee, Taika Waititi's feature film "Eagle vs. Shark" (2007) alongside the original soundtrack by the Phoenix Foundation.  In 2007 he composed the score for Marc Meyer's feature film debut  (2007) and the music for Paul Swadel's TV One New Zealand documentary  "The Big Picture" (2007) in collaboration with Dave Whitehead and Riki Gooch, which won "Best Original Score" at the Qantas Television Awards 2008. The same year, he completed the score for Brigitte Bertele's award winning feature film: "Nacht Vor Augen"(2008), which premiered on the 58th Berlin International Film Festival 2008 and one episode of the classic German crime show  "Tatort", directed by Didi Danquart. Christian wrote the film music to Brigitte Bertele's second feature film  (2011) which won for "best director" at the Montreal World Film Festival 2011, and to Juraj Lerotic's short film "Then I See Tanja" (2010), which won in the category "Checkers" at the Zagreb Film Festival 2010. In 2011 he scored 4 episodes of the German children's TV series "Löwenzahn" and the documentary "Family Meals" by Dana Budisavljević.

As a saxophone player, Christian has performed with the Berlin Philharmonic Orchestra, clair-obscur saxophone quartet, the New Zealand Symphony Orchestra, Auckland Philharmonia, Mendelssohn Kammerorchester Leipzig, DM Stith, Antony and the Johnsons and the artist collective Edison Woods amongst others. He performed with Michael Nyman at the Berlin Film Festival 2000 where he premiered the film music for Fernand Léger's Ballete Mechanique (1924). In 2005 he recorded the score for 3:20, written for solo saxophone by Gerald Busby, best known for his soundtrack of Robert Altman's 3 Women. After the collaboration, Gerald dedicated Speak for Christian, that he premiered in Carnegie Hall.

Awards 
 Qantas Television Awards 2008 for Best Original Music in General Television

References 
 interview on spoileralertradio

External links 
 
 
 Regoch (2006) by Helena Bulaja at Vimeo

1974 births
Living people
German film score composers
Male film score composers
German male composers
Alumni of the Royal College of Music
Berlin University of the Arts alumni